Kuntur Chukuña (Aymara kunturi condor, Aymara chukuña to squat, to cower, 'where the condor squats', also spelled Condor Chucuna, Condor Chucuña) is a mountain in the Andes of Bolivia, about  high. It is situated in the Oruro Department, Sebastián Pagador Province (which is identical to the Santiago de Huari Municipality), Lukumpaya Canton. It lies southeast of Poopó Lake, south of the village of Urmiri and northwest of Jatun Wila Qullu.

See also
List of mountains in the Andes

References 

Mountains of Oruro Department